Pebbles, Volume 6 may refer to:

 Pebbles, Volume 6 (1979 album)
 Pebbles, Volume 6 (1994 album)